Jamie Shepard Brown, II (born April 24, 1972) is a former American football offensive tackle in the National Football League for the Denver Broncos, the San Francisco 49ers, and the Washington Redskins. Brown won Super Bowl XXXII with the 1997 Broncos over the Green Bay Packers. He played college football at Florida A&M University and was drafted in the fourth round of the 1995 NFL Draft.

1972 births
Living people
American football offensive tackles
Florida A&M Rattlers football players
Denver Broncos players
San Francisco 49ers players
Washington Redskins players
Players of American football from Miami